Presley Underwood Ewing (September 1, 1822 – September 27, 1854) was a U.S. Representative from Kentucky.

Born in Russellville, Kentucky, Ewing attended the public schools.
He completed preparatory studies.
He was graduated from Centre College, Danville, Kentucky, in 1840 and from the law school of Transylvania University, Lexington, Kentucky, in 1843.
He studied theology at the Baptist Seminary at Newton, Massachusetts, in 1845 and 1846.
He returned to Kentucky and practiced law in Russellville.
He served as member of the Kentucky House of Representatives in 1848 and 1849.

Ewing was elected as a Whig to the Thirty-second and Thirty-third Congresses and served from March 4, 1851, until his death in the town of Mammoth Cave, Kentucky, September 27, 1854.
He was interred in Maple Grove Cemetery, Russellville, Kentucky.

See also
List of United States Congress members who died in office (1790–1899)

References

1822 births
1854 deaths
Centre College alumni
Transylvania University alumni
Kentucky lawyers
Members of the Kentucky House of Representatives
Whig Party members of the United States House of Representatives from Kentucky
19th-century American politicians
19th-century American lawyers